Eduardo da Silva Díaz (born 19 March 1966) is a retired Uruguayan footballer. Playing for Peñarol, he won the 1987 Copa Libertadores.

Honours
 Peñarol
 Uruguayan Primera División (2): 1985, 1986
 Copa Libertadores (1): 1987

 Uruguay
 Copa América (1): 1987

References

 

1966 births
Living people
Uruguayan footballers
Uruguay international footballers
Uruguayan people of Brazilian descent
1987 Copa América players
Uruguayan Primera División players
Peñarol players
Talleres de Córdoba footballers
Copa América-winning players
Association football midfielders